The Nebraska Cornhuskers wrestling team represents the University of Nebraska–Lincoln in the Big Ten Conference of NCAA Division I. The program has won seven conference titles and eleven individual NCAA championships. The team has been coached by Mark Manning since 2000.

Coaches

Coaching history

Coaching staff

All-Americans
Nebraska has produced over 100 All-Americans. NCAA National Champions are listed in bold.

Season-by-season results

Notable Nebraska Cornhusker wrestlers

 Gary Albright – professional wrestler, NCAA runner-up
 Jordan Burroughs – Olympic gold medalist in freestyle wrestling at 2012 Summer Olympics, seven-time World and Olympic level champion, two-time NCAA Champion
 Iron Mike DiBiase – professional wrestler, two-time NCAA qualifier
 Rulon Gardner – Olympic gold medalist in Greco-Roman wrestling at 2000 Summer Olympics and bronze medalist in 2004, World Champion in 2001, NCAA All-American
 James Green – two-time World Level medalist in freestyle wrestling (bronze and silver), four-time NCAA All-American
 Ed Husmann – former NFL player, Big Seven conference champion in wrestling as a heavyweight
 Matt Lindland – former UFC fighter, Olympic silver medalist in Greco-Roman wrestling at 2000 Summer Olympics, World silver medalist in 2001, NCAA qualifier
 Hugo Otopalik – collegiate wrestling head coach at Iowa State from 1924–1953
 Bob Pickens – Olympian at 1964 Summer Olympics, NCAA runner-up
 Baron von Raschke – former professional wrestler, World bronze medalist in Greco-Roman wrestling

Notes

References